Md. Golam Mostofa Biswas is a Bangladesh Awami League politician and a former Member of Parliament from Chapai Nawabganj-2 constituency.

Early life
Biswas was born on 11 June 1967. He has B.A. L.L.B. and a M.Sc. degrees.

Career
Biswas was elected to Parliament from Chapai Nawabganj-2 on 5 January 2014 as a Bangladesh Awami League candidate. He was denied a Bangladesh Awami League nomination for 2018 parliamentary elections.

References

Living people
1967 births
Awami League politicians
10th Jatiya Sangsad members
9th Jatiya Sangsad members